Raoul Lesueur (29 April 1912 – 19 August 1981) was a French cyclist. He started his career as a road racer, winning numerous competitions in the 1930s and Critérium des As in 1943. After World War II he focused on motor-paced racing. In this discipline he won a European title in 1950 and the UCI Motor-paced World Championships in 1947 and 1950. 

In the beginning of his cycling career, Lesueur moved from his native Le Havre to Nice and trained at the local "Vélodrome Pasteur". The Velodrome was heavily damaged by bombing in 1944, as it was likely confused with a factory building, and thus demolished in 1960. The former Avenue de Velodrome is now called Rue Raoul Lesueur.

References

1912 births
1981 deaths
French male cyclists
Sportspeople from Le Havre
UCI Track Cycling World Champions (men)
French track cyclists
Cyclists from Normandy